Henry James Nowak (born February 21, 1935) is an American lawyer, politician and a former Democratic member of the United States House of Representatives from New York between 1975 and 1993.

Early life
Nowak was born in Buffalo, New York attended public elementary schools in Buffalo and graduated from Riverside High School, Buffalo, in 1953. He earned a  B.A. from Canisius College, Buffalo in 1957.

During his college career, he was a star basketball player for the Golden Griffs. When he graduated in 1957, he was Canisius College's all-time scoring leader. In three years as a starter he scored 1,449 points and averaged 18.6 points a game. Today, he still ranks first in rebounding and third in all-time scoring. Sportswriters dubbed him "Hammerin' Hank" for his tough aggressive play. Nowak led the Griffs to three of their four appearances in the NCAA basketball tournament. The St. Louis Hawks subsequently drafted him with the 28th pick in the 1957 NBA Draft.

From 1957 to 1958 Nowak served in the United States Army, then earned a J.D. from the University of Buffalo Law School in 1961. He then served in the Army again from 1961 to 1962.

Political career
Admitted to the New York bar in 1963, he commenced practice in Buffalo, and served as assistant district attorney of Erie County, New York in 1964. Erie County Comptroller from 1964 to 1974, he was also a delegate to the New York State Democratic convention in 1970, and to the Democratic National Convention in 1972 and 1988.

Congress 
Nowak was elected as a Democrat to represent the 33rd and the 37th districts of the state of New York during the Ninety-fourth and to the eight succeeding Congresses. He served from January 3, 1975 to January 3, 1993,  and was not a candidate for renomination in 1992 to the One Hundred Third Congress. During his entire congressional career, he was a member of the U.S. House of Representatives Committee on Public Works and Transportation.

Family life 
A resident of Buffalo, New York, Nowak has a daughter, Diane (Nowak) Kent, who is also in the Canisius Sports Hall of Fame, inducted in 2002. His son, Henry Joseph Nowak, is a judge in the New York Supreme Court from the 8th district and is a former Buffalo Housing Court judge.

References

External links

1935 births
Living people
Politicians from Buffalo, New York
Canisius Golden Griffins men's basketball players
University at Buffalo Law School alumni
United States Army officers
American politicians of Polish descent
Democratic Party members of the United States House of Representatives from New York (state)
Lawyers from Buffalo, New York
American men's basketball players
Canisius College alumni